FC Levski is a Bulgarian football club based in Lom, which last played in the Second League, the second level of Bulgarian football league system. 

The club was founded in 1921. They play their home games at the 2,500-capacity Gradski Stadium. Their highest finishing position were in 1928 and 1934, ending in 5th place in Bulgarian State Football Championship under the name SC Maria Luisa. In 1939 they got to the quarter-finals of Bulgarian Cup.

History

Foundation 
The football history in Lom was started from the famous Swiss-Bulgarian teacher Louis-Emil Eyer, who started a football academy in the Nayden Gerov High School in 1894. In 1903 students from the school started the first football club in town - SC Nayden Gerov.

June 20, 1921 was the official establishment of SC Levski. In 1925, the team merged with SC Slaveykov Lom adopting the name SC Maria Luisa. As a result, Levski marked their highest finishing position was in 1928 and 1934, ending in 5th place in Bulgarian State Football Championship.

1945 - 1993 
After the World War II all sports clubs in Lom were formed into one named again Levski. In 1948 and 1949 in Lom were founded FC Botev, FC Dunav, FC Torpedo, FC DNA, FC Stroitel, FC Dinamo, DSO Lokomotiv, DSO Cherveno zname and several others. In 1954 DSO Lokomotiv was promoted to B Group. In the next year, it was merged with Cherveno Zname to form FD Levski. In 1956 Levski won B Group, but in the next season relegated to V Group.

In 1967, the team won its promotion to B Group once again. In 1969, the team adopted the name FD Dunav. After 6 conservative seasons in the second level of Bulgarian football, the team relegated to V Group. In 1975, the team won their promotion back to Second League, but was once again relegated to Third league in 1976. In 1978, team relegated to the Regional League where it spent most of the time between late 70s and 80s.

In 1990, the team once again adopted the name Levski. In 1993, it was promoted to B Group, but the team was dissolved in the half of the season, despite its 4th position.

2003 - 2017 
In 2003, the team was resurrected under the name SC Maria Luisa. In 2004, it was promoted to V Group and stayed in the league until 2009, when the team retired. A year later, the team joined the Amateur League, but was once again dissolved after just a season.

In 2012, Levski 2012 Lom was registered and joined B Regional League, with most of the players coming from the dissolved in the same year team FC Almus Beer Staliyska Mahala based in Lom. For the next season, the team was promoted to the A Regional League. Due to financial problems, the club left the league once again before end of the season. In 2015, the team joined B Regional League under the name Almus 2012 Lom, but was dissolved in 2017, after the team finished on 11th place in A Regional League.

2020 - present 
In July 2020, after the assistance of the mayor of Lom, Georgi Gavrailov, the administratively promoted to Third League team FC Rasovo, merged with Polomie 2012 Lom to form FC Levski 2020 Lom that joined the 2020–21 Third League season. Gavrailov also helped the team with renovating the football stadium and base. Ex Levski Sofia player Blagoy Krastanov was announced as manager. Despite finishing unbeaten in the first half of the season and as a leader of the group, on 17 March 2021 Ferario Spasov was announced as the new manager of the team. On 30 May 2021 Levski (Lom) clarified that the separation from the experienced specialist Ferario Spasov was by mutual consent. 

On 16 May 2021, Levski guaranteed their first place in North-West Third League and got promoted to Second League.

Honours
Bulgarian State Football Championship:
5th place (2): 1928, 1934

Second League:
Winners (1): 1956

V Group/Third League:
Winners (3): 1965–66, 1966–67, 1974–75, 2020–21

Bulgarian Cup:
Quarterfinals (1):  1939

 Players 
 First-team squad   For recent transfers, see Transfers summer 2021.''

Out on loan

Foreign players
Up to five non-EU nationals can be registered and given a squad number for the first team in the Bulgarian First League; however, only three can be used in a match day. Those non-EU nationals with European ancestry can claim citizenship from the nation their ancestors came from. If a player does not have European ancestry he can claim Bulgarian citizenship after playing in Bulgaria for 5 years.

Notable players
 
The footballers enlisted below have international caps for their respective countries or more than 100 caps for Levski. Players whose name is listed in bold represented their countries.
 

Bulgaria
 Yordan Yordanov Lyudmil Goranov Genadi Simeonov Stefan Yurukov Aleksandar Yanakiev Ivo Zhelezarov Mariyan Ognyanov'''

Club officials

Coaching staff and personnel

Manager history

Past seasons

References

External links
Club's Profile at bgclubs.eu

Football clubs in Bulgaria
1921 establishments in Bulgaria
Association football clubs established in 1921